The 1999 S.League was the fourth season of the S.League, the top professional football league in Singapore. Teams played each other once both home and away, in a 22-match season.

The 1999 S.League was won by Home United, their first S.League title.

Teams

The league expanded again to 12 teams with the addition of a newly formed team, Clementi Khalsa who were based in Clementi and played their home games at the Clementi Stadium. Clementi Khalsa were formed in order to give an S.League representation to the Singaporean Sikh community.

Foreign players
Each club is allowed to have up to a maximum of 4 foreign players.

League table

As 1999 S.League champions, Home United qualified to compete in the 2000–01 Asian Club Championship. This was their first appearance in continental competition. The club reached the second round of the East Asian half of the competition, defeating Polícia de Segurança Pública of the Campeonato da 1ª Divisão do Futebol 11–0 on aggregate before being defeated 6–1 on aggregate in the second round by Shandong Luneng Taishan of the Chinese Jia-A League.

Top scorer

References

Singapore Premier League seasons
1
Sing
Sing